Sit Down and Relax with Jimmy Forrest is an album by saxophonist Jimmy Forrest recorded in 1961 and released on the Prestige label.

Reception

Allmusic awarded the album 3½ stars stating it "gives one a good example of Jimmy Forrest's playing and fortunately his solos are not as relaxed and laidback as the album's title might imply".

Track listing 
 "Tuxedo Junction" (Julian Dash, Buddy Feyne, Erskine Hawkins, William Johnson) -  6:30  
 "Organ Grinder's Swing" (Will Hudson, Irving Mills, Mitchell Parish) - 5:25  
 "Moonglow" (Eddie DeLange, Hudson, Mills) - 5:44  
 "Tin Tin Deo" (Gil Fuller, Chano Pozo) - 7:29  
 "Rocks in My Bed" (Duke Ellington) - 7:06  
 "The Moon Was Yellow" (Fred E. Ahlert, Edgar Leslie) - 4:20    
 "That's All" (Alan Brandt, Bob Haymes) - 4:54 Bonus track on CD reissue

Personnel 
Jimmy Forrest - tenor saxophone
Hugh Lawson - piano
Calvin Newborn - guitar
Tommy Potter - bass
Clarence Johnston - drums

Production
Esmond Edwards - supervisor
Rudy Van Gelder - engineer

References 

Jimmy Forrest albums
1961 albums
Prestige Records albums
Albums recorded at Van Gelder Studio
Albums produced by Esmond Edwards